Galerie Chalette was a private contemporary art gallery in Manhattan, New York, USA. It was founded by the married art dealers and collectors Madeleine Chalette Lejwa (1915–1996) and Arthur Lejwa (1895–1972) in February 1954. The Lejwas were refugees from the Nazi invasions of Poland and France. Initially, their gallery specialized in contemporary French and Polish prints and painting. Later they changed its focus to contemporary 20th century American and European Sculpture, and especially the work of Jean Arp. 

"La Chalette" was perhaps best known for organizing important group exhibitions which were then offered to various museums around the United States, including Construction and Geometry in Painting (1960),  and Structured Sculpture (1960, 1968), as well as their major Arp exhibition, Jean Arp : from the collections of Mme. Marguerite Arp and Arthur and Madeleine Lejwa, at the Metropolitan Museum of Art, in 1972. 

The gallery closed in 1978.

History

Foundation
Madeleine Chalette was born in 1915 in Paris, France, and moved with her family to Poland as a child. In 1940, following her successful effort to secure the release of her father, Leon Chalette, from Sachsenhausen, a German concentration camp near Berlin, father and daughter traveled by boat to Shanghai, where they lived during World War II, arriving in the United States in 1946. Arthur Lejwa, a Polish-born biochemist, immigrated to the United States in 1939 and taught at Long Island University. He served as a representative of the Polish Government in Exile during World War II. His intentions of returning to Poland after the war were crushed when he received word that his entire family had perished in the Nazi gas chambers. He met Chalette soon after her arrival in the United States and they married in 1947.

45 West 57th Street
The gallery's early exhibitions in the 1950s were largely thematic. Chalette's pre-war connections and works by Marc Chagall, Pablo Picasso, and Georges Braque from the Chalette family collection helped establish the gallery as viable and set the tone for the gallery's future. The Lejwas prided themselves on their close friendships with the artists they represented. During the first four years of their gallery, they presented new works by Jean Arp, Chagall, Wassily Kandinsky, Kazimir Malevich, Henri Matisse, and Picasso. Picasso's sketch of Madeleine Lejwa from this period is now in the collection of the Israel Museum. The Lejwas also had an interest in African art. In 1956, they arranged for North African artisans to produce limited edition carpet designs by Picasso, Alexander Calder, Joan Miró, Jean Lurçat as well as several pieces by Fernand Léger.

1100 Madison Avenue

In 1957, the gallery expanded into new space on Madison Avenue. During this period the Lejwas liaised with Josef Albers, then head of the Yale Department of Design in New Haven. Albers, another European war refugee, worked with the Lejwas. In 1960, they mounted the group exhibit, Construction and Geometry in Painting, from Malevich to “tomorrow”, which included works by Albers, Arp, Max Bill, Sonia Delaunay, César Domela, Victor Vasarely, and others. This exhibition subsequently travelled to Cincinnati, Chicago, Minneapolis, and San Francisco. 

At the time, abstract expressionist painting had become mainstream gallery fare. This exhibition presented geometric abstract painting up to the present day, which was at that time a new aesthetic for the American audience, serious and silent (according to the bilingual catalogue text by Michel Seuphor) rather than attention provoking. Championing the geometric abstract aesthetic would become the work for which Galerie Chalette would become best known. 

A second exhibition formed through the Albers connection was the Structured Sculpture show in the same year, which included works by Norman Carlberg, Kent Bloomer,  Erwin Hauer, Stephanie Scuris, and Robert Engman, Deborah De Moulpied, all of whom were working at or for Yale (and Albers) at this time.

Gallerie Chalette continued to present Geometric and Constructivist ideas in solo exhibits from Burgoyne Diller (1961) and in a series of shows from Leon Polk Smith, including his Constellations exhibition of 1968.

88th Street
Galerie Chalette's final move to 9 East 88th Street, New York, was into the ground floor entry hall of a historical five-story brownstone building close to the Solomon R. Guggenheim Museum and two blocks away from the Metropolitan Museum of Art, the two museums with whom they arranged their last major exhibitions, Fangor, at the Guggenheim in 1970, and Arp with the Met in 1972.

Aesthetic  

"The Galerie Chalette’s distinctive quality was that it represented one stylistic direction, namely geometric abstraction." "Theirs was a story of continuous work on behalf of this style of artist, carried out with great commitment and capital investment. They were collectors and gallerists, and these aspects were indissolubly bound together."

The Lejwas published catalogues alongside each of their exhibitions, including color plates where possible and commentary by notable critics.  This practice reflected the Lejwas' loyalty to their artists and desire to see their artists' reputations and art established and available beyond the gallery's walls.  From a business perspective, this attention to the "secondary" art market (the resale of art following its original acquisition from the artist), contributed to La Chalette's increased stature as a gallery throughout the 1960s.

The gallery developed a spare yet specific and easily identifiable style for its catalogues, which ranged from relatively simple productions to elaborately printed, numbered, limited editions.

Representation

Artists
Artists represented by the Galerie Chalette included:

Albers, Josef, (1960)
Arp, Jean 
Bill, Max
Derain, André, (1957)
Diller, Burgoyne, (1964)
Engman, Robert
Fangor, Wojciech
Fuller, Sue   
González, Roberta
González, Julio, (1961)
Hepworth, Barbara
Moholy-Nagy, László
Picasso, Pablo
Reimann, William  
Rickey, George
Scuris, Stephanie 
Smith, Leon Polk
Vasarely, Victor
Weber, Max

Exhibitions
Selected:
Hepworth, (1959), Barbara Hepworth
Construction and Geometry in Painting, (31 March – 4 June 1960)  Traveling Schedule: Cincinnati Art Museum, Cincinnati (July–October), Arts Club of Chicago, Chicago (November–December), Walker Art Center, Minneapolis (January–February) 
Structured Sculpture, (1961)
Structured Sculpture, (1968)
Torn Drawings, (1965), Leon Polk Smith
Fangor, (1970) in collaboration with the Guggenheim
Jean Arp : from the collections of Mme. Marguerite Arp and Arthur and Madeleine Lejwa, (1972) in collaboration with the Met

Legacy

Arthur Lejwa died in New York in October 1972 and was buried in Jerusalem. Madeleine Lejwa reconfigured the gallery business as Chalette International and continued on as a dealer and consultant, reducing the exhibition aspects of the gallery's work. Madeleine Lejwa made donations to major museums in the United States, including Arp's Oriforme to the National Gallery of Art in 1978.

On Madeleine Lejwa's death in 1991, the Galerie Chalette papers were formally lodged at the Smithsonian Archives of American Art and the bulk of the Lejwa Collection went to the Israel Museum in Jerusalem, which, in 2004, produced a complete catalogue of the Arthur and Madeleine Lejwa Collection, featuring Picasso's image of Madeleine Lejwa on the cover. There were no family survivors of either the Chalette or Lejwa family.

References

Bibliography

External links
 Galerie Chalette catalogues on AbeBooks

1954 establishments in New York City
1978 disestablishments in New York (state)
Art galleries established in 1954
Art galleries disestablished in 1978
Defunct art museums and galleries in Manhattan
Contemporary art galleries in the United States